Gastev is a Russian surname. Notable people with the surname include:

 Aleksei Gastev (1882–1939), pioneer of scientific management in Russia.
 Yuri Gastev (1928–1993), Mathematician
 John Gastev (born 1964), Australian rules footballer

Russian-language surnames